Dais Records is an American independent record label founded in August 2007 by musicians Gibby Miller and Ryan Martin, based in Los Angeles, California, and Brooklyn, New York.  The label has released recordings from artists including Drab Majesty, Cold Cave, Iceage, King Dude, High Functioning Flesh, Genesis P-Orridge, Tor Lundvall, Youth Code, William S. Burroughs and Cold Showers.

Label roster

Reissues

References

External links
 Official website
 Facebook

American record labels
Experimental music record labels
Indie rock record labels